Éric Magnin (born 29 May 1967) is a French former cyclist. He competed in the men's point race at the 1992 Summer Olympics.

References

External links
 

1967 births
Living people
French male cyclists
Olympic cyclists of France
Cyclists at the 1992 Summer Olympics
People from Oullins
Sportspeople from Lyon Metropolis
Cyclists from Auvergne-Rhône-Alpes